Leucrocuta is a genus of mayflies in the family Heptageniidae.

Species
These 10 species belong to the genus Leucrocuta:
 Leucrocuta aphrodite (McDunnough, 1926) i c g b
 Leucrocuta hebe (McDunnough, 1924) i c g b
 Leucrocuta jewetti (Allen, 1966) i c g b
 Leucrocuta juno (McDunnough, 1924) i c g b
 Leucrocuta maculipennis (Walsh, 1863) i c g b
 Leucrocuta minerva (McDunnough, 1924) i c g
 Leucrocuta petersi (Allen, 1966) i c g b
 Leucrocuta thetis (Traver, 1935) i c g b
 Leucrocuta umbratica (McDunnough, 1931) i c g
 Leucrocuta walshi (McDunnough, 1926) i c g b
Data sources: i = ITIS, c = Catalogue of Life, g = GBIF, b = Bugguide.net

References

Mayfly genera
Mayflies